The Tunney Hunsaker Bridge (also known as the Fayette Station Bridge) is an historic truss bridge over the New River in New River Gorge, West Virginia. The bridge is named after Tunney Hunsaker, American boxer and former chief-of-police at Fayetteville, West Virginia.

Details
The bridge is a single-lane truss bridge consisting of one main span ( long) and two approach spans, a total length of  that carries County Road 82 (Fayette Station Road) over the New River.

History
Construction of the bridge was completed in 1889 by the Virginia Bridge and Iron Company of Roanoke, Virginia. When the New River Gorge Bridge opened in 1977, the bridge, in a deteriorated state, was closed to traffic, and was rehabilitated and reopened in 1997.

References

Sources
Trowbridge, David J., Philip Parlier, and Allison Frazier. "Fayette Station Bridge (Tunney Hunsaker Bridge)." Clio: Your Guide to History. August 3, 2020. Accessed April 17, 2021. https://www.theclio.com/entry/42242

External links
Gallery of bridge pictures at historicbridges.org
National Bridge Inventory Data Sheet (2013 Inventory)
HISTORIC AMERICAN ENGINEERING RECORD, National Park Service
Fayette Station Bridge, Spanning New River at County Route 82, Fayetteville, Fayette County, WV, Library of Congress

Bridges completed in 1889
Road bridges in West Virginia
Steel bridges in the United States